College Ground may refer to:

College Ground, Cheltenham, a cricket ground in the grounds of Cheltenham College, England
College Ground, Loughborough, a former cricket stadium in Loughborough, Leicestershire, England, now occupied by Loughborough University Students' Union
College Ground, Bulsar, India, hosted five Ranji Trophy games in the 1970s